Abdollah Veisi (born 22 March 1971 in Ramhormoz, Khuzestan Province) is an Iranian retired football player and manager, who is currently manager of Foolad in Persian Gulf Pro League.

Playing career
Veisi spent the Azadegan League 1999–2000 season and the Azadegan League 2000–01 playing for Sepahan, scoring two goals. In the following season, he transferred to Foolad.

Managerial career

Early years
In mid-2006, Veisi became assistant coach of Foolad. After the departure of Mohammad Mayeli Kohan, Veisi was appointed the manager of Foolad for the remainder of the season. He was soon replaced by Nenad Nikolić, in a season which saw Foolad relegated to the Azadegan League.

Saba Qom and Paykan
In 2009, he moved to Saba Battery, becoming the team's assistant coach, under the helm of Rasoul Korbekandi. After the team moved to Qom, he became the technical director and was eventually promoted to manager when Mahmoud Yavari was released from his contract. He kept Saba safe from the relegation zone in 2010–11 season but went on to produce very good results with the team in next season. This ended with the team finishing the season in 4th place and they qualified for the AFC Champions League. He left the team at the end of season. He signed a two-year contract with newly promoted Paykan on 14 May 2012 but was sacked on 27 January 2013 after a series of bad results.

Esteghlal Khuzestan
On 18 May 2013, he became head coach of another newly promoted team, Esteghlal Khuzestan. He led Esteghlal Khuzestan to 12th position in his first season, three points better than from relegation zone. In the second season, Esteghlal Khuzestan bought Rouhollah Seifollahi, Mohammad Reza Mahdavi, Soumbeïla Diakité, Mehdi Seyed Salehi, Meysam Baou and released Fábio Carvalho, Sohrab Bakhtiarizadeh, Adel Kolahkaj and Milad Meydavoudi. However, Veisi finished the season in the 14th position with Esteghlal Khuzestan, placed them in relegation play-off which they faced Mes Kerman. Esteghlal Khuzestan won the play-off 3–0 on aggregate thanks for goals from Mehdi Momeni and Lamine Diawara (twice) and kept their Persian Gulf Pro League spot.

Veisi extended his contract until 2018 after the end of the season and started promotion young talents from academy and Foolad Novin to the first squad. They started the season with three consecutive wins which was continued with four consecutive winning streak at the 12th week, which made Esteghlal Khuzestan finished champions of the first half of the season. After a great result with Veisi, Esteghlal Khuzestan managed to keep their shape at the second half of the season. On 1 January 2016, Esteghlal Khuzestan lost to Persepolis which made the race tighter for first place, and also made Esteghlal Khuzestan fall to second place, Esteghlal became first after 17th week. Veisi later said that our main goal is to take place at AFC Champions League. On 8 May 2016, Esteghlal Khuzestan qualified to the AFC Champions League for the first time after a 1–0 win over Padideh, which led Esteghlal Khuzestan to the top of the league with one game remaining. On 13 May 2016, Veisi won Iran Pro League title with Esteghlal Khuzestan after a 2–0 win over Zob Ahan. He was named as Iran Pro League best manager of the season after the end of the tournament.

Sepahan
On 23 May 2016, Veisi was named as new Sepahan manager with signing a four-year contract. He was sacked on 17 March 2017 after a series of bad results, placing Sepahan in the 7th place.

Return to Esteghlal Khuzestan
Veisi returned to Esteghlal Khuzestan in June 2017 with signing a two-year contract.

Statistics

Honours

Manager
Esteghlal Khuzestan
Persian Gulf Pro League (1): 2015–16
Azadegan League (1): 2012–13

Shahin Bushehr 
Azadegan League promotion (1): 2018–19

Individual
Persian Gulf Pro League Best Manager (1): 2015–16
IFCA Best Manager of the Year (1): 2016
IRFF Awards Manager of the Season (1): 2015–16
Iranian Manager of the Year (1): 2016

Trivia 
He became the subject of comparisons drawn between his likeness to famous ex Bayern München coach, Pep Guardiola by Iranian media.

References

External links

Living people
Iranian footballers
Sepahan S.C. footballers
Foolad FC players
Iranian football managers
1971 births
Paykan F.C. managers
Shahin Bushehr F.C. managers
Saba Qom F.C. managers
Association football fullbacks
Sportspeople from Khuzestan province
Persian Gulf Pro League managers